Sola Scriptura (Latin for "by scripture alone") is a 2007 Christian progressive rock concept album by multi-instrumentalist Neal Morse (his sixth studio album) about the life of the German theologian Martin Luther.

Performers on the record include Morse (vocals, keyboards, and guitar), Mike Portnoy (ex-Dream Theater) on drums, Randy George (Ajalon) on bass guitar, and Paul Gilbert (Racer X and Mr. Big) on guitar on the tracks "Upon the Door," "Do You Know My Name?" and "Two Down, One to Go."

Track listing
All songs written by Neal Morse.

Critical reception
In 2018, Sola Scriptura was ranked number 2 all time in the Neal Morse discography behind The Similitude of a Dream.

Personnel

Band
 Neal Morse - keyboards, guitars, vocals
 Mike Portnoy - drums
 Randy George - bass

Special Guest
 Paul Gilbert - lead guitar in "Upon the Door" and "Do You Know My Name?", flamenco guitar in "Two Down, One to Go"

Additional Musicians
 Chris Carmichael - violin, viola, electric violin
 Michael Thurman - French horn
 Rachel Rigdon - violin
 Hannah Vanderpool - cello
 Debbie Bresee - background vocals
 Richard Morse - background vocals
 April Zachary - background vocals
 Wade Browne - background vocals
 Joey Pippin - background vocals
 Amy Pippin - background vocals
 Revonna Cooper - background vocals
 Wil Henderson - additional vocals

Technical personnel
 Rich Mouser - mixing

References

External links
 kvltsite.com review

2007 albums
Neal Morse albums
Concept albums